Cruger Township is located in Woodford County, Illinois. As of the 2010 census, its population was 1,687 and it contained 593 housing units. Cruger Township formed from Olio Township on September 14, 1869.

Geography

Demographics

References

External links
City-data.com
Illinois State Archives

Townships in Woodford County, Illinois
Peoria metropolitan area, Illinois
Townships in Illinois